Claudio Brizi (born 1960) is an Italian organist and harpsichordist.

Life 
Born in Terni, he graduated in organ and organ composition with W. v. d. Pol at the Morlacchi Conservatory in Perugia, then specialized with J.Uriol, M.Radulescu, M.Morgan. Also studied harpsichord with A.Conti at the Conservatorio Giovanni Battista Martini in Bologna.
He teaches organ and organ composition at "Francesco Morlacchi" in Perugia.

Discography 

 Claviorgan Wonderland – Camerata Tokyo CMCD-28244
 Georg Friedrich Händel, Antonio Vivaldi, Carl Philipp Emanuel Bach – Sonate per Oboe e Basso Continuo (with Thomas Indermühle) Camerata Tokyo CMCD-28219
 Carl Philipp Emanuel Bach – Sonatas for Flute and obligate Claviorgan (2 CDs, with Wolfgang Schulz) Camerata Tokyo CMCD-20099-100
 Johann Ludwig Krebs – Sonate per oboe e Claviorgano Obbligato (with Thomas Indermühle) Camerata Tokyo CMCD-28145
 Domenico Zipoli – Complete Keyboard works (2 CDs) Camerata Tokyo CMCD-20082-3
 Wolfgang Amadeus Mozart – Sonate Kv 10-15 (with Giuseppe Nova)Camerata Tokyo CMCD-28101
 Johann Sebastian Bach – Brandenburg Concerto N. 5 BWV 1050, Triple Concerto in a-minor BWV 1044 (live recording) & Italian Concerto BWV 971 (Wolfgang Schulz, Paolo Franceschini, I solisti di Perugia, Gary Graden) Camerata Tokyo CMCD-28057
 Muzio Clementi – Sonate Op. 2 N. 3 & Op. 31 for Claviorgano and flute; Sonate Op. 21 N. 1 & N. 2 & Op. 22 N. 1 for Claviorgano flute and Cello (Flute: Naotaka Nishida, Cello Francesco Pepicelli) Camerata Tokyo CMCD-28035
 Duo a la Francaise – C. Saint-Saëns: 6 Duos Op. 8; M. Dupré: Variations sur deux Thèmes op. 35; Jean Guillou: Colloques n. 2 (Piano, Bruno Canino)Camerata Tokyo CMCD-28015	
 Antonio Vivaldi – Concerto in La minore RV 462, Sonata in Do maggiore RV 779, Concerto in sol minore RV 107, Concerto in fa maggiore “La Tempesta di Mare” RV 98, Concerto in sol minore “La Notte” RV 104, Concerto in re maggiore “Del Gardellino” RV 90 (Flute: Mario Ancilotti, Oboe: Thomas Indermühle, Violin: Paolo Franceschini, Bassetthorn: Wolfgang Meyer, Fagott: Milan Turkovic; “I Solisti di Perugia”) Camerata Tokyo CMCD-28019
 Wolfgang Amadeus Mozart – Missa Solemnis “Weisenhausmesse” K. 139 (Soprano: Edith Mathis, Kusatsu Festival Academy Orchestra & Chorus,Conductor: Jörg Ewald Dähler) Camerata Tokyo CDT-1049
 Johann Sebastian Bach – Sonata in g minor BWV 1029, Trio in G Maj BWV 655, Sonata in E flat Maj BWV 1016, Trio in g minor BWV 660, Sonata in G Maj BWV 1019 Duo in g minor BWV 768, Sonata in B minor BWV 1014 (Oboe: Thomas Indermühle) Camerata Tokyo CMCD-28052
 F. Chopin/R. Schumann – Piano Concertos for Piano & Organ 12 hands (Piano: Hiromi Okada & Costantino Catena) Camerata Tokyo CMCD-28293
 Georg Friedrich Händel, Aci, Galatea e Polyfemio. (2 CD’s) (Sopren: Daniela Uccello; Alt: Sonia Turchetta; bass: Giancarlo Tosi; Orchestra Camerata del Titano. Dir. Augusto Ciavatta) Dynamic CDS 272/1-2
 Girolamo Fantini – Otto Sonate per tromba e organo (Tromba Barocca: Igino Conforzi) Quadrivium SCA 025

References

External links
 Claudio Brizi's personal site

Conservatorio Giovanni Battista Martini alumni
Italian harpsichordists
Italian classical organists
Male classical organists
People from Terni
1960 births
Living people
21st-century organists
21st-century Italian male musicians